Brian James (born in Taylorville, Illinois in 1956) is an American basketball coach currently serving as an assistant coach of the Northwestern University. He previously served as an assistant coach for the Philadelphia 76ers (2010–2013) and Milwaukee Bucks (2005–2007).

Prior to joining the Milwaukee Bucks, James served as an assistant coach for the Detroit Pistons (1995–98), Toronto Raptors (1998–01) and Washington Wizards (2001–03). James also served as an advanced scout for the Seattle SuperSonics (2004–2005) as well as an NBA analyst for ESPN.com.

Before his NBA coaching career, James enjoyed heavy success coaching Illinois high school basketball. In 18 seasons, James accumulated a varsity record of 196-79 (.713), won five league championships with Glenbrook North High School, and appeared in the Illinois state tournament four times.  James began his coaching career as an assistant coach of the Wilmington High School boys' basketball team in Wilmington, Illinois in the late 1970s, and in the 1980s served as an assistant coach for the Taylorville High School boys basketball team.

On June 13, 2013, James became an assistant coach for Northwestern University.

References

External links 
 NBA.com Official Profile

1956 births
Living people
American expatriate basketball people in Canada
American men's basketball coaches
Basketball coaches from Illinois
Detroit Pistons assistant coaches
High school basketball coaches in the United States
Illinois State University alumni
Milwaukee Bucks assistant coaches
Northeastern Illinois University alumni 
Northwestern Wildcats men's basketball coaches
People from Taylorville, Illinois
Philadelphia 76ers assistant coaches
Seattle SuperSonics assistant coaches
Toronto Raptors assistant coaches
Washington Wizards assistant coaches
Washington Wizards announcers